Felistas may refer to

Felistas Muzongondi (born 1986), Zimbabwean association football player
The Felistas Fable, a 2013 Ugandan film